"No Time" is a song by American rapper Lil' Kim. It was released as her debut single in 1996 which served as the first single from Kim's debut album Hard Core. It peaked at number 18 on the Billboard Hot 100 and reached the Top 10 on the Hot R&B/Hip-Hop Songs. "No Time" topped the US Rap Songs for nine weeks, becoming Kim's first number 1 hit on that chart. Additionally, the song charted at number 45 on the UK Singles Chart. The single was certified Gold by the RIAA. "No Time" contains a sample of Vicki Anderson's "Message from the Soul Sisters" and Lyn Collins's "Take Me Just As I Am".

Music video
The music video, which was helmed by German director Marcus Nispel and filmed in the World Trade Center, features her and Puff riding up and down escalators while rapping. Kim makes reference to Adina Howard's hit single "Freak Like Me" in the song's lyrics when she says: "...your girl ain't a freak like me, or Adina". Kim makes a reference to the video in the 2003 song "(When Kim Say) Can You Hear Me Know " off the album La Bella Mafia, saying "...im the same bitch on the escalator", and also in the 2005 single Whoa when she says: "...told you I'm the same bitch from the escalator".

Formats and track listings
UK cassette single
"No Time" (Radio Edit) – 3:58
"No Time" (The Incident Remix) – 4:39

UK CD single 
"No Time" (Radio Edit) – 3:58
"No Time" (Radio Mix) – 5:03
"No Time" (Album Version) – 5:03
"No Time" (Instrumental) – 5:03

Europe CD single 
"No Time" (Radio Edit) – 3:58
"No Time" (The Incident Remix) – 4:39
"No Time" (Incident Remix Instrumental) – 4:38
"No Time" (Album Version) – 5:03
"No Time" (Instrumental) – 5:03

Credits and personnel
Vocals by Lil' Kim, S. Combs
Written by K. Jones, S. Combs, J. Brown
Produced by Sean "Puff Daddy" Combs and Steven "Stevie J" Jordan
Mastered by Herb Powers

Charts

Weekly charts

Year-end charts

Certifications

References

1996 debut singles
Lil' Kim songs
Sean Combs songs
Songs written by Sean Combs
Dirty rap songs
1996 songs
Songs written by Lil' Kim
Songs written by Stevie J
Songs written by the Notorious B.I.G.
Music videos directed by Marcus Nispel